Saint-Juéry is a commune in the Lozère department in southern France.

See also
Communes of the Lozère department

References

Saintjuery